Eli Marsden Wilson, A.R.E., A.R.C.E. (24 June 1877 – 13 November 1965) was an English artist who had 17 pictures exhibited at the Royal Academy.

He was born in Ossett, Yorkshire, the only son of Alfred Wilson, a foreman beamer, and Emma Marsden, and had five sisters.

After studying at Wakefield College of Art, he moved to the Royal College of Art in London, where he became a pupil of Sir Frank Short. The first picture Wilson exhibited at the R.A. in 1905 was an etching of Ossett Market as it was in Victorian times. In London he lived in Chelsea, then Acton. Also in 1905, he married Hilda Mary Pemberton (born 1871), the daughter of civil engineer Frederick Blake Pemberton and his wife Lucy.

A Quaker, vegetarian, and pacifist, he was a conscientious objector in World War I and as such was imprisoned in 1917 for two years.

In September 1922 he was commissioned by Princess Marie Louise to produce miniature etchings for Queen Mary's Dolls' House, at Windsor Castle. In November 2012 some of the etchings were shown on the BBC programme 'Antiques Roadshow', by his brother's great-grandson and great-great-granddaughters.

His late-1920s painted freeze, made of four panels, showing prehistoric England, can be seen in the Geological section of the Natural History Museum in South Kensington. The museum also holds his oil paintings, "Scene in Wealden Times" and two versions of "Nant Ffrancon Valley, North Wales".

He and Hilda moved to a cottage in Blewbury, Berkshire (now in Oxfordshire). Hilda died in 1957 and Wilson's pupil, Mary Cockburn, subsequently became his live-in companion. He died at his home, 9 Faraday Road, Acton, London, in November 1965, and was cremated at Mortlake, London, on 19 November.

Wilson was elected an Associate of the Royal Society of Painters, Etchers and Engravers (A.R.E.) in 1907, and served as Chairman of the Ealing Art Group from 1935 to 1947.

References

External links 
 BBC clip of Antiques Roadshow

1877 births
1965 deaths
People from Ossett
People from Acton, London
People from Blewbury
English etchers
Natural History Museum, London
English pacifists
English Quakers
English conscientious objectors
Alumni of the Royal College of Art